Pompei is a drama film, directed by Anna Falguères and John Shank and released in 2019. A coproduction of companies from Belgium, Canada and France, the film centres on a small group of aimless young people engaging in petty crime.

The film stars Aliocha Schneider, Garance Marillier, Vincent Rottiers and Auguste Wilhelm.

The film premiered in the Discovery stream at the 2019 Toronto International Film Festival.

References

External links

2019 films
Belgian drama films
Canadian drama films
French drama films
2019 drama films
2010s French-language films
French-language Belgian films
French-language Canadian films
2010s Canadian films
2010s French films